Małgorzata Klimek (born 1957) is a Polish mathematical analyst and mathematical physicist known for her research on the fractional calculus and fractional differential equations. She is a professor in the Institute of Mathematics and Dean of the Faculty of Mechanical Engineering and Computer Science at Częstochowa University of Technology in Poland.

Education and career
Klimek was born on 16 July 1957, in Bielsko-Biała. She completed her habilitation through the Institute of Theoretical Physics in 2003.

Klimek joined the staff of the Częstochowa University of Technology in 1985. She was named a full professor in 2015, and is Dean of the Faculty of Mechanical Engineering and Computer Science. She was president of the Częstochowa Branch of the Polish Mathematical Society for 2011–2013.

As well as many journal publications, she is the author of a research monograph on fractional differential equations, and two textbooks.

Recognition
Klimek has been given multiple awards by the rector of the Częstochowa University of Technology for her research and organizational accomplishments. In 2010 she was given the medal of the Commission of National Education.

References

1957 births
Living people
People from Bielsko-Biała
Polish mathematicians
Polish women mathematicians
Wrocław University of Technology alumni
University of Wrocław alumni